Leeland is a defunct settlement in Prince George's County, Maryland, United States. It was once a stop on the Baltimore and Potomac Railroad.

See also
St. Barnabas' Episcopal Church, Leeland
Bowieville

References

Former populated places in Maryland